This is a timeline of events in the history of Scottish nationalism.

843

1603

1707

1820

1979

1997

1999

2014

References

Scottish nationalism
Chronology